Drawing straws is a selection method, or a form of sortition, that is used by a group to choose one member of the group to perform a task after none has volunteered for it. The same practice can be used also to choose one of several volunteers, should an agreement not be reached. It is a form of the practice of drawing lots, only using straws instead.

Process 
The group leader takes a number of straws (or similarly long cylindrical objects) and ensures that one of them is physically shorter than the others. The leader then grabs all of the straws in their fist, such that all of them appear to be of the same length.

The group leader offers the clenched fist to the group. Each member of the group draws a straw from the fist of the group leader. At the end of the offering, the group member who has drawn the shortest straw is the one who must perform the task.

This practice is epitomized in the cliché "drawing the short straw"—to mean being randomly, unluckily, or unfairly selected to perform a task, at the risk of suffering a penalty.

Politics

United Kingdom 
In the United Kingdom, if a local or national election has resulted in a tie in which candidates receive exactly the same number of votes after three recounts, the winner must be decided by random selection. 

On 5 May 2017, Local election candidates in Northumberland drew straws to decide the winner in South Blythe Ward. Liberal Democrat candidate Lesley Rickerby was declared the winner, denying Conservatives overall control of Northumberland County Council.

United States 

On 20 November 2015, a Mississippi state election was settled by drawing straws after both candidates received 4,589 votes. This resulted in Blaine Eaton being re-elected to the Mississippi House of Representatives.

See also
 Custom of the sea
 The Nose Game

References

Sampling (statistics)
Games of chance